Rutevac is a village in the municipality of Aleksinac, Serbia. According to the 2002 census, the village has a population of 1094 people.

In antiquity, Rutevac was known as Praesidium Pompei.

References

Populated places in Nišava District